The Pontiac City Hall and Fire Station is a historic building located at 110 W. Howard St. in Pontiac, Illinois, which served as both Pontiac's city hall and fire station. The building was constructed in 1900 to replace an 1883 building which also served as both a city hall and a fire station. Architect John H. Barnes designed the building in the Romanesque Revival style. Though built as a single building, the city hall and fire station are separated on the interior; a bell tower connects the two buildings. The building housed both Pontiac's city government and fire protection services until 1986.

The building was added to the National Register of Historic Places on August 16, 1990.

Pontiac Museum Complex
The building is now home to several museums and themed exhibits, which are collectively known as the Pontiac Museum Complex.

Route 66 Association of Illinois Hall of Fame and Museum
The Route 66 Association of Illinois Hall of Fame and Museum features memorabilia related to U.S. Route 66, one of the original highways within the U.S. Highway System. Displays include photos, signs, license plates, and the VW van of Route 66 artist Bob Waldmire.

Livingston County War Museum
The Livingston County War Museum features artifacts, films, books, uniforms and weapons from 20th and 21st century conflicts involving the United States.

Bod Waldmire Experience
The Bob Waldmire Experience is located on the 2nd floor of the Pontiac Museum Complex. Displays include his art, photos and other artifacts that show the artistic and spiritual development of this Route 66 artist, preservationist, naturalist and icon.

Life in the 1940s Exhibit
This display features four rooms completely furnished with furniture and artifacts from the 1940s, including a bedroom, kitchen, toys and newspapers.

Music of the Civil War Exhibit
This exhibit focuses on 19th-century music from around the time of, during and after the American Civil War. Displays include sheet music, antique musical instruments and recorded versions of these songs.

References

External links

 Route 66 Association of Illinois Hall of Fame and Museum
 International Walldog Mural and Sign Art Museum
 Livingston County War Museum
 Visit Pontiac, Illinois: Museums and Exhibits

City and town halls on the National Register of Historic Places in Illinois
Fire stations completed in 1883
Government buildings completed in 1883
Fire stations completed in 1900
Government buildings completed in 1900
Towers completed in 1900
Romanesque Revival architecture in Illinois
Buildings and structures in Livingston County, Illinois
Defunct fire stations in Illinois
National Register of Historic Places in Livingston County, Illinois
City and town halls in Illinois
Fire stations on the National Register of Historic Places in Illinois